Juan Núñez II de Lara ( – 1315), nicknamed el Mozo or el de la Barba (the bearded one), was a Spanish noble, and head of the House of Lara in the service of the Kingdom of Castile.

Amongst other titles, he was the Mayordomo Mayor del Rey four times and was the Adelantado Mayor de la Frontera de Andalucía. He was also the nominal title holder over the Sinyoría d'Albarrazín though it was incorporated into the crown of the Kingdom of Aragon in 1300.

Family origins 

Juan's parents were Juan Núñez I de Lara (d. 1294), head of the House of Lara, and Teresa de Haro, daughter of Diego López III de Haro, the seventh Lord of Biscay and of Constanza de Bearne. Teresa was the sister of Lope Díaz III de Haro and of Diego López V de Haro, both Lords of Biscay.

Biography 

In the chronicles of the king, Sancho IV of Castile, one anecdote is dedicated to this Juan Nunez where the monarch entrusts Juan with the care of his son, infante Ferdinand.

According to Carlos Estepa Díez, this text reveals that between infancy and coming of age, it can be deduced that Juan Nunez II was brought for the first time before King Sancho IV, when he would have been around 12 to 14 years of age.

In 1290, after a confrontation that his father had with the king, the queen, María de Molina proposed as a solution, the marriage of Juan Nunuez I's son with Isabel Alfonso de Molina, daughter of Blanca Alfonso de Molina, half sister of the queen and of Alfonso Fernández de Castilla el Niño, the illegitimate son of King Alfonso X of Castile.

Throughout his life, Juan Nunez fought against and allied himself with both Diego López V de Haro and John of Castile in a strategic power struggle for land and influence over king Ferdinand IV. This lifelong fight culminated in the loss of most of Juan Nunez' lands and territories at the hands of the king when he surrendered to royal forces after a protracted siege of his town at Tordehumos.

Lara managed to eventually regain his status and some of his titles after his participation and distinction in Ferdinand IV's invasion of Granada. While the expedition eventually ended in failure, Lara had several exploits, including the taking of the town of Gibraltar from Moorish forces. He also participated in the disastrous Siege of Algeciras of 1309 and retreated with the army in 1310. Lara was one of the few followers of the king who did not desert his service during the war.

According to the chronicles of the King Alfonso XI of Castile, Juan Nunez II de Lara died in 1315 during the Courts of Burgos.

Marriage and legacy 

In 1290 Juan married for the first time with Isabel Alfonso de Molina, who died in 1292. She was the daughter of Alfonso Fernández de Castilla el Niño, the illegitimate son of King Alfonso X of Castile, and of Blanca Alfonso de Molina, Señora of Molina and Mesa. This marriage produced no offspring.

In 1295, he married María Díaz de Haro, daughter of the infante John of Castile and his wife, María I Díaz de Haro. The couple had no children.

In 1300, he married a third time with María Díaz III de Haro, daughter of Diego López V de Haro, Lord of Biscay, and his wife, the infanta Violante de Castilla y Aragón. Without succession.

Without descendants from any of his three marriages, coupled with his brother, Álvaro Núñez de Lara dying in 1287, when he died he ceded all his titles to his sister, Juana Núñez de Lara. She was married with the infante Ferdinand de la Cerda, grandson of Alfonso X of Castile

Bibliography 

 

 

 

1315 deaths
Spanish untitled nobility
Order of Santiago
Juan
Year of birth unknown
Year of birth uncertain
1276 births